Pyramide is a studio album by French singer M. Pokora, released in 2019. The album has been certified triple platinum in France for sales of 300,000 copies.

A re-edited album with additional songs was released on 8 November 2019, and an "ultimate" re-edited version on 4 December 2020.

Track listing
CD
"Pyramide" - 2:55
"Les planètes" 3:50
"Ouh na na" - 3:02
"Seul" 2:55
"La regarder s'en aller" 3:26
"Alter ego" 3:55
"California Sunset" 4:14
"Effacé" - 3:22
"Barrio" - 3:22
"Perdu" - 3:05
"Tombé" - 3:53
"L'amour vs l'amitié" - 3:45
"Two Left Feet" - 3:29

LP
LP 1:
"Pyramide" - 2:55
"Les planètes" - 3:50
"Ouh na na" - 3:02
"Seul" - 2:55
"La regarder s'en aller" - 3:26
"Alter ego" - 3:55
"California Sunset" - 4:14
"Effacé" - 3:22

LP 2:
"Barrio" - 3:22
"Perdu" - 3:05
"Tombé" - 3:53
"L'amour vs l'amitié" - 3:45
"Two Left Feet" - 3:29
"Sommet" - 3:09
"Pour nous" - 3:01
"Douleur" - 3:19

Digital
"Pyramide" - 2:55
"Les planètes" 3:50
"Ouh na na" - 3:02
"Seul" 2:55
"La regarder s'en aller" 3:26
"Alter ego" 3:55
"California Sunset" 4:14
"Effacé" - 3:22
"Barrio" - 3:22
"Perdu" - 3:05
"Tombé" - 3:53
"L'amour vs l'amitié" - 3:45
"Two Left Feet" - 3:29
"Sommet" - 3:09
"Pour nous" - 3:01
"Douleur - 3:19

Extras:
DVD with the documentary À l'intérieur de la Pyramide - 13 minutes

Re-release (8 November 2019)
"Pyramide" - 2:55
"Les planètes" 3:50
"Ouh na na" - 3:02
"Seul" 2:55
"La regarder s'en aller" 3:26
"Alter ego" 3:55
"California Sunset" 4:14
"Effacé" - 3:22
"Barrio" - 3:22
"Tombé" - 3:53
"L'amour vs l'amitié" - 3:45
"Two Left Feet" - 3:29
"Sommet" - 3:09
"Douleur" - 3:20
"Tango électrique" - 3:01
"Si t'es pas là" - 3:53
"Comme des fous" - 2:43
"Danse avec moi" - 2:53
"Zizizaza" (feat. Megz) - 2:50
"Mama" - 3:13
"Les planètes" (feat. Philippine - Les planètes [#MPPlanètesChallenge]) - 3:52

Ultimate Re-release (4 December 2020)
"Pyramide" - 2:55
"Les planètes" 3:50
"Ouh na na" - 3:02
"Seul" 2:55
"La regarder s'en aller" 3:26
"Alter ego" 3:55
"California Sunset" 4:14
"Effacé" - 3:22
"Barrio" - 3:22
"Tombé" - 3:53
"L'amour vs l'amitié" - 3:45
"Two Left Feet" - 3:29
"Sommet" - 3:09
"Douleur" - 3:20
"Tango électrique" - 3:01
"Si t'es pas là" - 3:53
"Comme des fous" - 2:43
"Danse avec moi" - 2:53
"Zizizaza" (feat. Megz) - 2:50
"Mama" - 3:13
"Les planètes" (feat. Philippine - Les planètes [#MPPlanètesChallenge]) - 3:52
"Si on disait" - 3:07
"Demain" - 2:48
"Incendie" - 3:05
"S'en aller" - 3:05
"Se revoir" - 3:27
"Si on disait" [Remix] (feat. Dadju) - 3:10

Charts

Weekly charts

Year-end charts

Certifications

References

2019 albums
M. Pokora albums